is a Japanese retired football player. He played for the Japan national team. His brother Hisato Sato is also footballer.

Club career
Sato was born in Kasukabe on March 12, 1982. He joined J1 League club JEF United Ichihara (later JEF United Chiba) from youth team in 2000. He debuted in 2000 and played many matches as defensive midfielder from 2002. In 2003, he completely became a regular player and JEF United finished at the 3rd place under new manager Ivica Osim. After that, JEF United won the champions in 2005 and 2006 J.League Cup.

In 2008, Sato moved to Kyoto Sanga FC. He played as regular player in 2 seasons.

In 2010, Sato re-joined JEF United Chiba which club was relegated to J2 League from 2010 season. He played as regular player and JEF United qualified for Promotion Playoffs to J1 for 3 years in a row (2012-2014). However the club missed promotion for J1.

In October 2019, he announced he would play the last season for the club. In January 2020, he became "Club Officer", representing the club in several occasions.

National team career
In August 2006, when Sato played for JEF United Chiba, he was selected Japan national team under new manager Ivica Osim who is manager for JEF United until July 2006. On August 16, Sato debuted for Japan against Yemen.

Club statistics
.

National team statistics

References

External links

Japan National Football Team Database

 Profile at JEF United Chiba

1982 births
Living people
Association football people from Saitama Prefecture
Japanese footballers
Japan international footballers
J1 League players
J2 League players
JEF United Chiba players
Kyoto Sanga FC players
Japanese twins
Twin sportspeople
Association football midfielders